, also known by its Spanish title "¿Dónde quiere estar mi alma viajero?, is a song by Japanese enka singer Sayuri Ishikawa, and digital download single by Japanese singer-songwriter Ringo Sheena.

Background and development 
The song is written by Ringo Sheena and was recorded in Sayuri Ishikawa's album "X -Cross II-" released on April 23, 2014 from Teichiku Records. Sheena covered the song for herself later and released it as a digital download single on May 13, 2015 from EMI Records.

Ishikawa's version was used as the advertising jingle of the snack food "Cheeza" of Ezaki Glico. Sheena's version was used as the theme song for the anime film "Miss Hokusai" and was released worldwide following a schedule adjusted to the world release of the film.

Track listing

Personnel
Ishikawa version
 piano: Masaki Hayashi
 accordion: Yoshiaki Sato
 quena: Hikaru Iwakawa

References

External links
 Sayuri Ishikawa "X-Cross-" special website
 Ringo Sheena "Saihate ga MItai" special website

2014 songs
2015 singles
Japanese film songs
Japanese-language songs
EMI Music Japan singles
Ringo Sheena songs
Songs written for animated films
Songs written by Ringo Sheena
Sayuri Ishikawa songs